Angelo Dessy (10 July 1907 - 17 January 1983) was an Italian actor. He appeared in more than fifty films from 1940 to 1974.

Filmography

References

External links 

1907 births
1983 deaths
Italian male film actors